"Right Here" is a song written and performed by Christian singer-songwriter Jeremy Camp. It was the second radio single released in promotion of his debut studio album, Stay. The single reached the No. 9 position on the Billboard Hot Christian Songs airplay chart. This song also appears on the WOW Hits 2005 compilation album and Music from and Inspired by Bridge to Terabithia. Versions also appear on the live albums Live Unplugged and Jeremy Camp Live.

Track listing
"Right Here" (Radio Mix)
"Right Here" (Album Version)

Performance credits
Jeremy Camp – vocals, guitars
Luke Agajanian – bass
Andy Dodd – piano, keyboards, guitars, background vocals
Julian Rodriguez – drums
Adam Watts – guitars, percussion, piano, background vocals

Charts

References

2002 singles
Jeremy Camp songs
2002 songs
Songs written by Jeremy Camp